Chlumec is a municipality and village in Český Krumlov District in the South Bohemian Region of the Czech Republic. It has about 100 inhabitants. The village of Krnín within the municipality is well preserved and is protected by law as a village monument zone.

Administrative parts
The village of Krnín is an administrative part of Chlumec.

References

Villages in Český Krumlov District